North Shillong is one of the 60 Legislative Assembly constituencies of Meghalaya state in India. It is part of East Khasi Hills district and is reserved for candidates belonging to the Scheduled Tribes. It falls under Shillong Lok Sabha constituency. The seat is vacant following the resignation of Adelbert Nongrum, fomerly of the Khun Hynniewtrep National Awakening Movement (KHNAM) on 12 January 2023. Nongrum won the seat again following the 2023 Meghalaya Legislative Assembly election.

Members of Legislative Assembly
The list of MLAs are given below

|-style="background:#E9E9E9;"
!Year
!Member
!colspan="2" align="center"|Party
|-
|2013
| Roshan Warjri
|
|-
|2018
|rowspan=2|Adelbert Nongrum
|
|-
|2023
|
|-
|}

Election results

2018

See also
List of constituencies of the Meghalaya Legislative Assembly
Shillong (Lok Sabha constituency)
East Khasi Hills district

References

Assembly constituencies of Meghalaya
East Khasi Hills district